Blagoj Strachkovski (1920–1943) was a Macedonian national hero, Yugoslavian partisan who died during World War II.

Biography
Blagoj Strachkovski was born in Veles, 29 February 1920 in a poor Macedonian family. After he finished his primary education he started looking for a job. He spent his childhood working on the fields, working it the quarry, etc. He became a member of the syndicate and he took part in many demonstrations and strikes.

The Communist Party of Yugoslavia saw his activities, while he was working in the syndicate so, he became a member of Communist Young Party of Yugoslavia (SKOJ) and at the end of the year he became a member of the Communist Party of Yugoslavia (KPJ). When the war started and Bulgarian occupiers went to Veles, Blagoj was chosen as a member for the local committee of KPJ in Veles and secretary of the local committee of SKOJ. During 1941 and 1942 he contacted many people because the most important priority was to form a partisan detachment. The detachment was formed in April 1942. Blagoj was working on popularization of the detachment and accepting new members.

All these activities have contributed his stay in Veles to be very dangerous for his life so in September 1942 he became a member of the Partisan Detachment "Dimitar Vlahov". The detachment has 3 bands and Blagoj was political commissar of the Second band. He was very brave when there was battle and in the villages where they were going he was speaking to the villagers and he organized meetings where he was calling the local people to expel the occupiers fighting against them. In December 1942, the Bulgarian occupiers started to work on decomposition of the detachment. One of that was the separation of the detachment near Zelenikovo. Blagoj with one group of partisans had to go to Black Mountain of Skopje (Skopska Crna Gora) but because of the snow which there was plenty of it, they had to come back in the town. They were hiding in the town for a while because they were unable to contact the people from the party. After that they went to Rosoman where they have been seen and they were caught and taken to Veles military barracks. There they were tortured very badly. They were asking him everything but Blagoj didn't answer anything. On 13 January 1943, Blagoj only said that the partisans would win the war. When the Bulgarian occupiers heard this they were very angry so the cut him alive on pieces and buried him alive.

On 11 October 1953, he was awarded the title National Hero of Yugoslavia and Macedonia by the president of Yugoslavia Josip Broz Tito in honor of his bravery, work and desire to live in free and independent Macedonia.

Literature
 Спомен книга на загинатите борци во НОБ и жртви на фашистичкиот терор од Велес и Велешко. „Просвета", Велес 1985.
 Народни хероји Југославије. „Младост", Београд 1975.

1920 births
1943 deaths
Yugoslav Partisans members
Yugoslav communists
Recipients of the Order of the People's Hero
People from Veles, North Macedonia